Talkative Man is a novel by R. K. Narayan first published in 1986 by Heinemann. Like his earlier novels, this one is also set in the fictional town of Malgudi. The novel is a bit short by Narayan's standards but provides the same level of enjoyment one experiences with his other writings.

Plot
The main character is an ordinary man who is wealthy and works as a journalist. He has a regular routine in his life: posting articles in the post box, having a talk with people at the tea shop, going to the library and the house. One day, he meets a man from an unknown land called "Timbuctoo", another of Narayan's creations, the land being similar to the US. The man seems to have come for an official duty for the  UN and seeing the calmness of the place, decides to stay there for his work.

References

1986 novels
Novels by R. K. Narayan
Novels set in India
Novels about journalists
Heinemann (publisher) books
1986 Indian novels